The Boxcar Children: Surprise Island is a 2018 American computer-animated adventure film featuring the voices of Joey King, Talitha Bateman, Griffin Gluck, Carter Sand, Gil Birmingham, Stephen Stanton, Dane DeHaan, J. K. Simmons and Martin Sheen.  It is the sequel of the 2014 film The Boxcar Children. The film premiered on May 8, 2018 in theatres.

Voice cast
Joey King as Jessie Alden: Jessie is the older sister. She was first shown in The Boxcar Children. She likes to take care of all her family members, including grandfather and Henry (they are older than her). She did all the cooking and housework when the kids were spending their summer in the barn in Surprise Island.
J. K. Simmons as Dr. Moore: Dr. Moore was an old friend of the Alden family. He was first shown in The Boxcar Children, but made cameo appearances in this movie. In The Boxcar Children, he helped the children meet with their grandfather, whom the children thought was mean and ran away from him.
Martin Sheen as James Henry Alden: James Henry Alden is the grandfather of the children. He is a kind and wealthy man. He made his first appearance in The Boxcar Children. In The Boxcar Children, the children thought he was mean and had run away from him, but Dr. Moore helped to solve the misunderstanding. 
Gil Birmingham as Lonan Browning: Lonan Browning is an old friend of Joe, or John Joseph Alden. Joe used to work for him. Lonan was first introduced in this film. 
Dane DeHaan as John Joseph Alden: John Joseph Alden, or simply Joe, is the cousin (or sometimes shown as uncle, because Joe's father was the children's grandfather's brother) of the children. He made his first appearance in this movie. At first, he did not reveal that he is from the Alden family, because he was afraid of James Henry Alden because Joe had made James Henry Alden believe that Joe had died when he fell from a cliff. He helped Captain Daniel with chores around, and liked to spend time with the children. At last, when his identity was revealed to everyone, James Henry Alden made Joe the director of the Alden Museum.
Griffin Gluck as Henry: Henry is the older brother and the oldest sibling. He was first shown in The Boxcar Children. He is very protective of his younger siblings. Henry is very good at making paper birds and wooden things. He worked to make arrangements in the barn. Henry was voiced by Zachary Gordon in the first film.
Talitha Bateman as Violet: Violet is the younger sister. She was first shown in The Boxcar Children. She likes to do painting and art and craft. She also knows how to play the violin – Joe taught her. Violet also helped Jessie to cook in the barn. Violet was voiced by Mackenzie Foy in the first film.
Stephen Stanton as Captain Daniel: Captain Daniel is a good friend of grandfather. He is shown to sail the motorboat from the mainland to Surprise Island. His first appearance is in this movie. He also helped Joe to hide from grandfather.
Carter Sand as Benny: Benny is the younger brother and the youngest sibling. He was first shown in The Boxcar Children. He is shown to be mischievous and claims Joe to be his best friend, even though Joe is their cousin. He likes to help his siblings in different chores. Benny was voiced by Carter Sand's older brother Jadon Sand in the first film.
Davis Pak as Mike: Mike is Benny's friend. He is first shown in this movie. Benny and Mike squabble a lot. His brother is Pat.
Watch: Watch is the Alden's dog. He loves his family very much. He is also friends with Spotty, Pat and Mike's dog.
Spotty: Spotty is Pat and Mike's pet dog. He is friends with Watch.

Reception
Renee Schonfeld of Common Sense Media awarded the film three stars out of five.

References

External links
 
 

2018 animated films
2018 films
2010s English-language films
American animated films
Animated films directed by Mark A.Z. Dippé
Films set on fictional islands
2010s American films
Animated films about children
Animated films about orphans
Animated films about siblings